Moody Lake is a natural freshwater lake in Pasco County, Florida. It was once one body of water, but it now is in two parts having been split when Interstate 75 was built through its center. Ten islets are contained within this lake. Its shores are very wooded and a few residences dot its shores. There are no public boat ramps or no public swimming areas on the shore. None of the fishing websites have information about types of fish in this lake.

References

Lakes of Florida
Lakes of Pasco County, Florida